Cardiacs are an English rock band hailing from Kingston upon Thames, Surrey. The band was formed by frontman Tim Smith with his brother bassist Jim Smith, vocalist Michael Pugh and drummer Peter Tagg in 1977. Since its inception, more than a dozen keyboardists, percussionists, vocalists and saxophone players have cycled through the group. The brothers were the only constant in Cardiacs' regularly changing line-up.

After playing his first gig as Gazunder, Tim Smith formed Cardiacs under the name Cardiac Arrest, and released their debut single "A Bus for a Bus on the Bus" in 1979. It was recorded by the band's first full lineup, including keyboardist Colvin "Max" Mayers and saxophonist Ralph Cade. The same year, Tagg was replaced by Mark Cawthra and went on to form the Trudy with Cade. Cardiac Arrest's reputation was kickstarted with two cassette-only albums — The Obvious Identity (1980) and Toy World (1981) — and they adopted the name Cardiacs on the second. During this time, Mayers left and later joined the Sound. Cade was replaced by Sarah Cutts in 1981 on keyboards and saxophone, who married Tim Smith three years later. By 1983, the band had reached a semi-stable lineup with percussionist and keyboardist Tim Quy, keyboardist William D. Drake and drummer Dominic Luckman. For a short time, Cardiacs were an eight-piece with the employment of guitarist Graham Simmonds and saxophonist Marguerite Johnston, who featured on the cassette album The Seaside (1984) released by their own label the Alphabet Business Concern.

The six-piece lineup toured extensively alongside Alphabet label representatives the Consultant and Miss Swift. Shortly after releasing On Land and in the Sea (1989), Cardiacs were joined by guitarist Christian "Bic" Hayes the same year. Hayes appeared on the video and subsequent live album All That Glitters Is a Mares Nest (1992; 1995), which was also their last performance with Quy. Drake and Sarah Smith also left the group, continuing to guest on future albums, and Hayes was replaced by guitarist and keyboardist Jon Poole in 1991. By 1992, the band had slimmed to a four-piece for Heaven Born and Ever Bright, displaying a new metal-leaning sound. Mayers died due to complications with AIDS in 1993. Luckman was replaced by drummer Bob "Babba" Leith the same year, giving Cardiacs their second "classic" lineup on Sing to God (1996). The lineup continued on Guns (1999) with assistance from session musicians.

Poole subsequently left Cardiacs to join the Wildhearts as a bassist after playing in Silver Ginger 5. He was replaced by guitarist Kavus Torabi in 2003 who played on the two volume live album The Special Garage Concerts (2005). Between 2004 and 2008, Cardiacs expanded their lineup to include vocalists Claire Lemmon and Melanie Woods of Sidi Bou Said and Sharron Fortnam of the North Sea Radio Orchestra, as well as percussionists Cathy Harabaras and Dawn Staple. The collective released the single "Ditzy Scene" in 2007, teasing an upcoming double album called LSD which was due to be released in October 2008. Cardiacs stopped touring the same year, and the band's lineup comprised Tim Smith, Jim Smith, Bob Leith, Kavus Torabi, Melanie Woods and Cathy Harabaras until the 2008 hospitalisation of Tim Smith resulted in an indefinite hiatus. On 22 July 2020, it was confirmed by Torabi that Smith had died of a heart attack the previous night. Former percussionist Tim Quy died on 2 February 2023 after a lengthy battle with several health problems.

Members

Current

Former

Honorary 
Some members of the Cardiacs crew are listed on the album liner notes of Greatest Hits (2002) alongside the other band members.

Session

Touring

Timeline

Lineups

Notes

References

External links 

 History page on Cardiacs official website

Cardiacs